"Safesurfer" is a song by the English singer-songwriter Julian Cope. It was released as a single in promotion of his 1991 tour for Peggy Suicide.

Track listing 
UK 7" single (JC 1)
"Safesurfer" (Cope)  – 8:07
"If You Loved Me at All" (Cope, Skinner)  – 5:00

Accolades

References

1991 singles
Julian Cope songs
1991 songs
Island Records singles
Songs written by Julian Cope